Chips is a studio album from Swedish group Chips. It was released in June 1980, as the group's debut album, and peaked at number 22 on the Swedish Albums Chart.

Track listing

Side A
A Little Bit of Loving
Sympathy
Weekend
So Long Sally
Starry Night
Paris

Side B
I Remember High School
Sensation
Don't Cry no More
It Takes More Than a Minute
In Arabia
Can't Get over You

Charts

References

1980 debut albums
Chips (band) albums